Tõnis Vint (22 April 1942 – 22 June 2019) was an Estonian graphic artist, considered by some to have been one of the most important artists of the 1960s to 1980s in Estonia.

Biography 
Vint was born in Tallinn. His exhibition in the city's art museum, KUMU, continued to September 9, 2012. Alongside it, KUMU published a book, Tõnis Vint and his aesthetic universe.

Vint was influenced by the art of China and Japan, by psychoanalysis, and by comparative analysis of ornaments from different cultures. Vint's frequent use of bold lines and sharp contrast has drawn comparisons to the work of Aubrey Beardsley.

References

Literature
 Tõnis Vint and His Aesthetic Universe. KUMU, 2012.

External links
The Labyrinth and Paths of Eternal Return: the joint exhibition by Tõnis Vint and Kiwa
Tõnis Vint and His Aesthetic Universe
Symmetrical Worlds – Mirrored Symmetries.

1942 births
2019 deaths
20th-century Estonian male artists
21st-century Estonian male artists
Artists from Tallinn
Recipients of the Order of the White Star, 4th Class